Holochilus is a genus of semiaquatic rodents in the tribe Oryzomyini of family Cricetidae, sometimes called marsh rats. It contains five living species, H. brasiliensis, H. chacarius, H. nanus, H. oxe, and H. sciureus, which are widely distributed in South America east of the Andes. A fourth species from the Pleistocene of Bolivia was formerly classified as H. primigenus, but is now placed in the genus Reigomys.

References

 
Rodent genera
Taxa named by Johann Friedrich von Brandt
Taxonomy articles created by Polbot